IMM or imm may refer to:

In companies, institutions, and organizations
IMM Graduate School of Marketing, South Africa
 Industries Mécaniques Maghrébines, a Tunisian and Algerian manufacturer of Isuzu vehicles
 Institut für Mikrotechnik Mainz (Mainz Institute of Microtechnology)
 Institute of Molecular Medicine (disambiguation)
 Instituto de Medicina Molecular (University of Lisbon Institute of Molecular Medicine)
 Institution of Mining and Metallurgy
 International Mercantile Marine Co., a shipping trust in the early twentieth century
 Institut for Marketing Management, at Zurich University of Applied Sciences/ZHAW

In events
 imm Cologne, international furniture trade fair

In places
 IMM (Singapore), shopping mall in Singapore

In  science and technology
 Inner mitochondrial membrane
 Immortal (MUD), an administrator or developer on a MUD
 Interacting multiple model (IMM), an estimator used in radar tracking
 Injection molding machine
 Microsoft Interactive Media Manager, a collaborative media management system
 Integrated Management Module, an IBM remote system management technology

In other uses
 Indianmeal Moth (Plodia interpunctella)
 International Monetary Market, a unit of the Chicago Mercantile Exchange

Sustainable development
 Integrated Modification Methodology